Flag Fork is an unincorporated community in Franklin County, Kentucky, United States. Its post office  is closed.

References

Unincorporated communities in Franklin County, Kentucky
Unincorporated communities in Kentucky